Dlažov is a municipality and village in Klatovy District in the Plzeň Region of the Czech Republic. It has about 500 inhabitants.

Administrative parts
Villages of Buková, Miletice, Nová Víska, Soustov and Vráž are administrative parts of Dlažov.

Gallery

References

Villages in Klatovy District